"Rencontre" is a song by French-Senegalese singer Disiz featuring Belgian rapper Damso. It was released on 17 March 2022. It debuted atop  the French charts.

Charts

References

2022 singles
2022 songs
SNEP Top Singles number-one singles